Antonio Giovanni "Anthony" Maestranzi (born July 1, 1984) is an American-Italian basketball player who last played for Pallacanestro Virtus Roma.

At 175 cm, he plays the point guard position. Maestranzi played for Italy at EuroBasket 2011.

Maestranzi was recently terminated as the head boys varsity basketball coach at Guilford High School in Rockford, Illinois due to an in season arrest.

References

https://www.rrstar.com/sports/20190226/e-rabs-hold-off-guilford-for-30th-win

1984 births
Living people
Basketball players from Chicago
Italian men's basketball players
Northern Illinois Huskies men's basketball players
Pallacanestro Virtus Roma players
Point guards
Viola Reggio Calabria players
People from Bartlett, Illinois
American men's basketball players